World Update was BBC World Service's morning news strand. Broadcast at 1006 GMT, it was also carried by PBS stations across the United States. Between 2003 and 2020, the programme was  presented by Dan Damon. On 25 June 2012, World Update became the first English-language World Service programme to come from Broadcasting House.

In January 2020, the BBC announced that it would be discontinuing World Update.

Presenters

Current

Former
 American journalist Vicki Barker was the main presenter from 1997 to 2003.

See also

 BBC News
 BBC World News, The BBC's International Television Station

References

External links
 

BBC World Service programmes
BBC news radio programmes